11 Dreams is the third album by Danish extreme metal band Mercenary, released through Century Media Records. The original version was released in 2004, that being in Europe, the American version was released one year later, in 2005. The U.S. release contained two bonus tracks, one being a 3D version of the song "11 Dreams", and another being a radio edit of the song. This is the first album featuring Mike Park on drums and Martin Buus on lead guitars. This is also the final album to feature founding member Henrik "Kral" Andersen on bass guitar and death growls.

Reception

"Denmark's Mercenary are following bands like In Flames and Soilwork in terms of adding more symphonic and melodic elements to their brand of extreme metal with their latest release 11 Dreams. A greater emphasis is placed on catchy vocal hooks, where the clean vocal passages from Mikkel Sandager trade off with the more aggressive death/black metal stylings from bass player Henrik 'Kral' Andersen."

"Highly progressive, Mercenary are influenced by bands like Soilwork, In Flames, Nevermore, Sentenced, and pretty much anything Scandinavian and influential, as well as occasionally throwing in a bit of thrash."

Track listing

Personnel
Jakob Mølbjerg – rhythm guitar
Mikkel Sandager – clean vocals
Henrik "Kral" Andersen – death growls, bass
Morten Sandager – keyboards
Mike Park – drums
Martin Buus – lead guitar

Guest appearances
Monika Pedersen – additional vocals on "Firesoul" and "Falling"
Jacob Hansen – backing vocals on "Sharpen the Edges"
Ziggy – backing vocals on "Sharpen the Edges"

Production
Art by Niklas Sundin

References

2004 albums
Century Media Records albums
Mercenary (band) albums
Albums produced by Jacob Hansen